Francis Duclair Mbome Mbome (born 30 November 1988) is a former footballer who played as a midfielder. Born in Cameroon, he has represented Equatorial Guinea internationally.

Career
Mbome's career spanned several countries, including Cameroon, Equatorial Guinea, and now he currently plays for Minnesota Twin Stars, making his NPSL debut in 2009, aged 21. He, along with several key players led the team to their second successive Midwest NPSL title.

International career
Mbome played in all six qualifiers against teams such as Nigeria, South Africa, and made his Equatorial Guinea national team debut on 1 June 2008 in a World Cup 2010 Qualifying match against Sierra Leone in Malabo. That day the Nzalang Nacional (the nickname of Equatorial Guinea national football team) won 2–0. Mbome received another call up on 29 March 2011 for a match vs Gambia, in a 1–0 victory.

Personal honours
Pandores:
2004: 2nd Place in 2nd Division Center Province
Les Astres:
2005: 3rd place in the 1st Division, and qualify to the CAF Cup
Akonangui:
2007: Equatoguinean Cup winner, 3rd place in the Equatoguinean Premier League and a place at the CAF Cup
Minnesota Twinstars:
2009: NPSL Midwest Regional Champion

References

External links

Francisco Mbome at MinnesotaTwinstars.com

1988 births
Living people
Footballers from Yaoundé
Equatoguinean footballers
Equatorial Guinea international footballers
Cameroonian footballers
Naturalized citizens of Equatorial Guinea
Cameroonian emigrants to Equatorial Guinea
Equatoguinean Roman Catholics
Equatoguinean expatriate footballers
Expatriate footballers in Cameroon
Akonangui FC players
Expatriate soccer players in the United States
Association football midfielders
Les Astres players